The Hsinchu City Council is the elected city council of Hsinchu City, Republic of China. The council composes of 34 councilors lastly elected through the 2018 Republic of China local election on 26 November 2022.

History
The city council was established on 1 July 1982 with 24 sets for its first term.

Organization
 Disciplinary Committee
 Procedural Committee
 The First Review Committee
 The Second Review Committee
 The Third Review Committee
 The Fourth Review Committee
 Secretary
 Council Affairs Section
 General Affairs Section
 Legal Affairs Section
 Accounting Office
 Personnel Office

Speakers
 Hsieh Wen-chin (2010-2018)
 Hsu Siou-ruei (2018-)

Transportation
The council is accessible within walking distance North West from Hsinchu Station of Taiwan Railways.

See also
 Hsinchu City Government

References

External links

 

1982 establishments in Taiwan
City councils in Taiwan
Hsinchu
Organizations established in 1982